Ruby chocolate is a variety of chocolate introduced in 2017 by Barry Callebaut, a Belgian–Swiss cocoa company. In development since 2004, it was patented in 2015 by inventors Dumarche et al. and assigned to Barry Callebaut under patent number US9107430B2. It was unveiled at a private event in Shanghai on 5 September 2017. It is marketed as the fourth type of chocolate alongside dark, milk, and white chocolate varieties and has a pink color.

Overview
The chocolate is characterized by a taste that has been described as slightly sweet and sour, which is comparable to that of berries, as the chocolate's main characteristic is its acidity. In a comparison of the phenolic content between varieties of chocolate, ruby chocolate was rated between milk and white chocolate. According to standards set by the Food and Drug Administration in the United States ruby chocolate must contain a minimum of 1.5% nonfat cacao solids and a minimum of 20% by weight of cacao fat. It may contain antioxidants, spices, and other natural and artificial flavorings; however, these ingredients cannot mimic the flavors of chocolate, milk, butter, or a fruit, and it cannot contain additional colouring.

The chocolate is made from "ruby cocoa beans". These are existing botanical cocoa bean varieties that have been identified as having the right attributes to be processed into ruby chocolate. While the exact production method is a trade secret, publications note industry speculation is that ruby chocolate is made with unfermented cocoa beans of Brazil Lavados, which can have a natural red-pink colour. Barry Callebaut registered a patent in 2009 for "cocoa-derived material" from unfermented cocoa beans (or beans fermented for no more than three days) that become red or purple after treating them with an acid, such as citric acid, and then defatting with petroleum ether or probably with CO.  

It has been debated by chocolate experts whether ruby chocolate constitutes a new variety of chocolate or if it is a marketing strategy. Chocolate expert Clay Gordon stated that ruby chocolate could become as diverse as white chocolate. Kennedy's Confection magazine editor Angus Kennedy disputes that ruby chocolate is a new fourth variety and compared the taste to a combination of white chocolate and raspberries. The public interest of the chocolate variety has been linked to the popularity of the color pink in marketing and on social media in the 2010s, a phenomenon that is referred to as "millennial pink".

Commercial availability 

The first mass market release of a ruby chocolate product was on 19 January 2018, when it was introduced as a coating for a new Kit Kat wafer bar in Japan and South Korea. Nestlé, the manufacturers of Kit Kat, entered into an agreement with Barry Callebaut for exclusive use of the product for six months. Upon release in Japan, one bar cost 400 yen (USD$3.60). In April 2018, Fortnum & Mason launched a pure ruby chocolate bar in the United Kingdom followed by Nestlé who announced the release of the ruby chocolate Kit Kat in the United Kingdom and Germany. In anticipation for Mother's Day in 2019, Kit Kat Canada announced the release of the ruby chocolate in Canada in a tweet.

Various other confectionery companies have released ruby chocolate-based products including:
 Bachmann, a confectionery based in Lucerne, released several ruby chocolate products in May 2018, including pure bars.
 Chocolove released a "Ruby Chocolate" bar which has been available since 2019 or late 2018.
 Insomnia Coffee Company launched "Ruby Hot Chocolate" made from the ruby cocoa bean in March 2019.
 Costa Coffee released "Ruby Hot Chocolate" made from ruby cocoa in January 2020.
 Häagen Dazs released a limited-edition ruby cacao ice cream in January 2020.
 Magnum released sweet cream ice cream bars dipped in a ruby chocolate in January 2020.
 Harry & David, a chocolate company based out of Medford, Oregon, sells ruby cacao truffles and a ruby cacao bar.
 Starbucks offers a "Ruby Flamingo Frappuccino" as of 2020.
Francestle Chocolatier, a chocolate manufacturer based in Malaysia released a Ruby Chocolate bar. in box packaging

References

External links

Chocolate
Types of chocolate
Fortnum & Mason
Food and drink introduced in 2017